Ukrainian dancers (previously known as Russian dancers) is a theme series of pastels by Edgar Degas depicting Ukrainian women performing folk dances. Degas created these drawings during the 1890s and early 1900s, and was probably motivated by Ukrainian dancers performing in Paris at the time.

The dancing women came from the Russian Empire,  in English and French sources, despite vast ethnographic and art historical evidence for the Ukrainian origin of the women.
	
There were a number of voices calling for changing the misleading "Russian" name, criticizing it as "deliberate or just lazy misinterpretation" of Ukraine for many years. These calls intensified with the beginning of Russian invasion in Ukraine in February 2022. The increased focus prompted London's National Gallery to rename a drawing from its collection Ukrainian dancers in April 2022.

In February 2023 Metropolitan Museum changed the name of one of the pastels to Dancers in the Ukrainian dress after calls from Ukrainian representatives including an art historian and journalist.

Pastels 
There are at least 18 pastels and sketches of Ukrainian dancers created by Degas, mostly in the second half of the 1890s.

Lisa Bixenstine classifies them as 6 finished pastels, 4 unfinished ones, and 8 sketches.

References

Sources

Literature 
 Richard Kendall and Jill DeVonyar. Degas and the Ballet: Picturing Movement. Exhibition catalog, Royal Academy of Arts. London, 2011, pp. 19, 227, 229–31, 237
 David Bomford et al. in Art in the Making: Degas. Exhibition catalog, National Gallery. London, 2004

Paintings by Edgar Degas
Dance in art
1890s paintings
1900s paintings